After Thomas is a television drama film, first broadcast in the United Kingdom on 26 December 2006, on ITV. It was produced by Beryl Vertue and Elaine Cameron, directed by Simon Shore, and written by Lindsey Hill.

The plot is about the severely autistic child Kyle Graham and the progress he makes when his parents adopt Thomas, a golden retriever. It is based on the true story of Scottish child Dale Gardner and his dog Henry.

Plot 
Kyle Graham (Andrew Byrne) is a severely autistic child with limited communication skills, has really bad meltdowns and is not toilet-trained. His condition tests the patience of his parents Nicola (Keeley Hawes) and Rob (Ben Miles).

Nicola believes that the symptoms of Kyle's autism can be made less severe over time by attempting to integrate him with the world around him. Rob, however, believes that the best solution is to send Kyle to a specialist boarding school run by the charismatic and caring headteacher John Havers (Clive Mantle).  Rob, who has not had sex with his wife for years, becomes more torn when family friend Rachel (Lorraine Pilkington) offers him casual sex. Nicola's only respite is the unwavering support of her mother Pat (Sheila Hancock) and father Jim (Duncan Preston), who dote on Kyle and provide practical support when needed.

Open-minded on autism therapies, Nicola reads about a child whose condition improved with the help of a therapy dog; Rob remains sceptical, believing that Kyle will either be terrified of the dog or oblivious to its existence. Kyle names his golden retriever puppy Thomas after Thomas the Tank Engine. Slowly, through Thomas, he learns about emotions and interpersonal relationships. Rob discovers that he can quell his son's tantrums by speaking in a different voice that Kyle believes is that of Thomas. Rob and Nicola's marriage improves and she becomes pregnant with her second child. Thomas falls ill and the couple fear that if the dog should die, their son will regress. However, he makes a full recovery. In the final scene of the film, Kyle acknowledges his parents for the first time and says that he loves them.

Before the credits, an epilogue shows what happened to the real-life counterparts portrayed as characters in the film.

Cast 
 Keeley Hawes - Nicola Graham
 Ben Miles - Rob Graham
 Andrew Byrne - Kyle Graham
 Sheila Hancock - Grandma Pat
 Duncan Preston - Grandpa Jim
 Asa Butterfield - Andrew
 Clive Mantle - John Havers
 Lorraine Pilkington - Rachel
 Noma Dumezweni - Paula Murray
 Gill Hutley - Class Teacher

Reception
Moviemail called After Thomas "gritty, warm and funny, but above all else is a realistic insight into every parent's worst nightmare."

Dr Joyce Almeida wrote in a review on the website of the Royal College of Psychiatrists that the film "offers an excellent platform for anyone wanting to learn about the subject of autism and the spectrum of disorders associated with it" and noted its potential as a teaching tool.

References

External links 
.

2006 television films
2006 films
ITV television dramas
Films about autism
British television films
Animal-assisted therapy
Films set in 1993
Films directed by Simon Shore